Meta Platforms (formerly Facebook, Inc.) is a technology company that has acquired 91 other companies, including WhatsApp. The WhatsApp acquisition closed at a steep $16 billion; more than $40 per user of the platform. Meta also purchased the defunct company ConnectU in a court settlement and acquired intellectual property formerly held by rival Friendster. The majority of the companies acquired by Meta are based in the United States, and in turn, a large percentage of these companies are based in or around the San Francisco Bay Area. Meta has also made investments in LuckyCal and Wildfire Interactive.

Most of Meta's acquisitions have primarily been "talent acquisitions" and acquired products are often shut-down. In 2009, Meta (as Facebook) CEO Mark Zuckerberg posted a question on Quora, titled "What startups would be good acquisitions for Facebook?", receiving 79 answers. He stated in 2010 that "We have not once bought a company for the company. We buy companies to get excellent people... In order to have a really entrepreneurial culture one of the key things is to make sure we're recruiting the best people. One of the ways to do this is to focus on acquiring great companies with great founders."  The Instagram acquisition, announced on April 9, 2012, appears to have been the first exception to this pattern. While continuing with a pattern of primarily talent acquisitions, other notable product focused acquisitions include the $19 billion WhatsApp acquisition and the $2 billion Oculus VR acquisition.

Acquisitions

See also 
 List of largest mergers and acquisitions
 Lists of corporate acquisitions and mergers

References

 
Meta Platforms
Meta Platforms
Meta Platforms-related lists